Baku Ferris Wheel, also known as the Baku Eye and Devil's Wheel, is a ferris wheel on Baku Boulevard in the Seaside National Park of Baku, capital of Azerbaijan.The wheel was built by the Dutch company Dutch Wheels. It was opened 10 March 2014 by Azerbaijani president Ilham Aliyev, and opened to the public two days later.

It makes a complete turn in 30 to 40 minutes. The cabins of the Ferris Wheel are equipped with air conditioners. Small monitors have been set up so that passengers can spend their time entertaining. The doors of the attraction are opened and closed in a centralized manner in order to ensure safety. At the same time, with this purpose all the cabinets are covered with transparent glass constructions. There are special ladders for each cabinet, which is designed to facilitate the evacuation of passengers in the case of any malfunction in the attraction. Users of "Satan's Ride" have the opportunity to gaze the Baku Bay, the Flag Square, the Crystal Hall and the whole city.

References

See also 
 Baku Boulevard

Ferris wheels
Buildings and structures in Baku
2013 establishments in Azerbaijan